David Rindskopf is an American psychologist and applied statistician, currently a Distinguished Professor at City University of New York, and a published author of both books and many articles in refereed journals. . He is a Fellow of the American Statistical Association (ASA), was the President of its New York section, and American Educational Research Association (AERA) and also former editor of the ASA-AERA journal Journal of Educational and Behavioral Statistics.

Dr. Rindskopf has served as an expert witness and is a statistical consultant and has been an invited speaker at conferences in England, Germany, Belgium, and Holland.

Rindskopf was an undergraduate at Antioch College and Iowa State University where he received a bachelor's degree with a double major in mathematics and psychology.  He completed his doctorate in psychology with a specialization in statistics and research methodology at Iowa State University. He was a post-doctoral fellow in research and statistics at Northwestern University in Evanston, Illinois.   He joined the CUNY faculty in 1979.

References

External links

City University of New York faculty
Graduate Center, CUNY faculty
21st-century American psychologists
Fellows of the American Statistical Association
Antioch College alumni
Iowa State University alumni
Living people
1948 births
Quantitative psychologists
20th-century American psychologists